Chope is a real time restaurant-reservation booking platform that connects diners with its partner restaurants. The name “Chope” was inspired by the term chope spoken colloquially in Singapore. Chope charges restaurants fixed and per-diner fees for the use of its table booking system.

Chope was founded on 15 June 2011, with the intention of providing a real-time online service for the process of table reservations.

At the time of its startup, restaurateurs and café owners had been known to be slow to adapt to technology advancements. However, aided by the rise in internet access, this trend has been slowly changing. In July 2012, Chope announced its application had grown to be used by over 1,000,000 diners.

Investment and Funding History

On June 30, 2015 the company announced it had secured an investment of US$8M in a series C round co-led by F&H Fund Management, a fund chaired by Alibaba CTO John Wu, and NSI Ventures.

In April 2016, the company announced its acquisition of MakanLuar.com - an Indonesian restaurant reservations platform co-founded by Kunal Narang and Hiro Mohinani.

On October 16, 2017, Chope announced that it had raised a Series D funding of US$13M. The round is led by Asia-Pacific investment firm Square Peg Capital and joined by C31 Ventures and Moelis Australia. Existing investors NSI Ventures, Susquehanna International Group, DSG Consumer Partners, and SPH Ventures also came in for a top-up.

Services

For users
The website and the mobile app allow users to search for restaurants and reservations based on parameters including cuisine, location, and price range. Users can also receive Chope Dollars, a rewards-point system.

The company also has a mobile application that allows users to find and book dining reservations.

For restaurants
The service provides restaurant owners with features aiding in reservation management.

Features include:

Reservation management manages making, changing, canceling and confirming reservations
Guest management keeps track of customer preferences, repeat customers, and targeted marketing to customers
Table management assists restaurant staff in seating customers and tracking table status
Reporting provides analytics.

Markets
The company's home market is Singapore. It has also expanded to other Asian markets including Hong Kong, Mainland China, Thailand and Indonesia.

References

External links

Online food ordering
Online marketplaces of Singapore
Internet properties established in 2011